Van Camp is a surname. Notable people with the surname include:

Aaron Van Camp (1816–1892), American Civil War spy
Al Van Camp (1903–1981), American baseball player
Benjamin Van Camp (born 1946), Belgian scientist
Emily Van Camp (born 1986), Canadian actress
Jeff Van Camp (born 1987), American football player
Richard Van Camp (born 1971), Canadian writer
Susan Van Camp (born 1959), American fantasy artist

Other uses
Van Camp, Wetzel County, West Virginia

See also
Van Camp's, ConAgra Foods brand
Van Camp accounting, California property law accounting method
Van Camp, Wetzel County, West Virginia, unincorporated community in the United States
Stokely-Van Camp Industrial Complex, building in Trenton, New Jersey
Potter-Van Camp House, historic house in Steuben County, New York

Surnames of Dutch origin
Dutch-language surnames